Embroidered lace is embroidered  on a base using a needle. The base varies according to the type. 

Many techniques use a net, either woven or knotted. The net varies:
 Woven fabric with threads removed to make a grid (Reticella, Buratto)  
 Machine made hexagonal net (Limerick,  Needlerun net, Tambour)
 Knotted square net (either hand-made or machine-made) (Filet) 

Sol laces are embroidered in a circular pattern on radiating spokes of threads. These include Tenerife lace and Ñandutí lace.

References

Lace
Embroidery